Seiichi Suzuki  (born 1956) is a Japanese philologist who is Professor of Old Germanic Studies at Kansai Gaidai University.

Biography
Seiichi Suzuki gained a BA in English studies from Osaka University in 1979, a MA in English Language and Literature from Nagoya University in 1981, a PhD in Linguistics from University of Texas at Austin in 1986. His PhD was supervised by Winfred P. Lehmann and Edgar C. Polomé. Suzuki has later received an MA (1997) and D.Litt. (2015) in Medieval Studies from the University of York. His D.Litt. was supervised by Tania Dickinson. 

From 1981 to 1987, Suzuki was Assistant Professor of English at Chukyo University. From 1987 to 1994, he was Assistant Professor, and then Associate Professor, of English and Linguistics at Hiroshima University. Since 1999, Suzuki has been Professor of Old Germanic Studies at Kansai Gaidai University.

Suzuki has served on the editorial board of The Interdisciplinary Journal for Germanic Linguistics and Semiotic Analysis (1996-), General Linguistics (2001-2007), Journal of Germanic Linguistics (2002-), NOWELE (2012-), Historical Linguistics in Japan (2012-2014), and Studia Metrica et Poetica (2013-). He is a Fellow of the Society of Antiquaries of London and a Member of the Institute for Advanced Study.

Selected works
 The morphosyntax of detransitive suffixes -Þ- and -n- in Gothic, 1989
 The metrical organization of Beowulf, 1996
 The Quoit Brooch Style and Anglo-Saxon settlement, 2000
 The metre of Old Saxon poetry, 2004
 Anglo-Saxon button brooches, 2008
 The meters of Old Norse eddic poetry, 2014

See also
 Robert D. Fulk
 Dennis Howard Green

References

External links
 Seiichi Suzuki at the website of the Institute for Advanced Study
 Seiichi Suzuki at Academia.edu

Alumni of the University of York
Anglo-Saxon studies scholars
Fellows of the Society of Antiquaries of London
Germanic studies scholars
Academic staff of Hiroshima University
Institute for Advanced Study people
Japanese medievalists
Japanese non-fiction writers
Japanese philologists
Nagoya University alumni
Old Norse studies scholars
Osaka University alumni
University of Texas at Austin alumni
1956 births
Living people